Robert Charles Julien Ritchie (22 January 1884 – 10 June 1954) was an  Australian rules footballer who played with Geelong in the Victorian Football League (VFL).

Death
He died in Parkville on 10 June 1954.

Notes

External links 

1884 births
1954 deaths
Australian rules footballers from Victoria (Australia)
Geelong Football Club players